Satar Rural District is a rural district (dehestan) in Kolyai District, Sonqor County, Kermanshah Province, Iran. At the 2006 census, its population was 5,160, in 1,327 families. The rural district has 30 villages.

References 

Rural Districts of Kermanshah Province
Sonqor County